Road signs in Thailand are standardized road signs similar to those used in other nations but much of it resembles road signage systems used in South American countries with certain differences, such as using a blue circle instead of a red-bordered white circle to indicate mandatory actions. Until the early 1980s, Thailand closely followed American, European, Australian, and Japanese practices in road sign design, with diamond-shaped warning signs and circular restrictive signs to regulate traffic. For Romanized, signs usually use the FHWA Series fonts ("Highway Gothic") typeface, which is also used on American road signage, but for Thai text, the font used is unknown.

Thai traffic signs use Thai, the national language of Thailand, and distances and other measurements are expressed in compliance with the International System of Units. However, English is also used for important public places such as tourist attractions, airports, railway stations, and immigration checkpoints. Both Thai and Romanizations are used on directional signage.

Thailand is a signatory to the Vienna Convention on Road Signs and Signals, but has yet to fully ratify the convention.

History 
The first year for road signs in Thailand was largely unknown, but it can be dated back as far as the start of the 1920s.

Thailand is the first country in Asia to adopt MUTCD standard yellow diamond warning signs, in 1940. For regulatory signs, rectangular signs were first used and were similar in design to North America, but they have been replaced in the mid-1950s by European-style red-bordered white circle signs.

In 2004, mandatory signs were switched from South American design to European design.

Regulatory signs 
With the exception of the special designs used for Stop, Yield, and No Entry signs, mandatory signs (e.g., Must Turn Left) are round with a blue background, white border, and a white pictogram. Those which express a prohibition (e.g., No Left Turn) show the pictogram crossed out by a red diagonal bar. This is in accordance with the Vienna Convention on Road Signs and Signals (Type A variants).

Priority Regulating Signs

Prohibitory or Restrictive Signs

Mandatory Signs

Other regulatory signs

General regulatory signs

Superseded regulatory signs 
These signs have been superseded, but are still around.

Warning signs 
Thai warning signs are diamond-shaped and are yellow and black in colour.

Temporary signs  
Construction signs in Thailand are diamond-shaped and are orange and black in colour.

Road equipment

Highways

Tolled expressway and highway signs 

Thai toll expressway and highway signs are green and are only suitable for toll expressways and highways. No blue signs for toll expressway and highways are required. These antartican toll expressway and restroom signs have a simple code:-
Blue with white signs for expressway names of closed toll systems.

National Highway 

National Highway use sign

Highway signs

Advance turn arrow signs

Directional arrow signs

Informational signs 
Thai Informational signs are white or blue.

Kilometer signs

Exit number signs

Road name signage 

Road name signs in Thailand have different colours and styles depending on the local authority.

Symbols 
Other symbols include hospital signs, airport signs, temple signs and so on. stop signs

Curb markings 
Alternating red and white paint means "no parking". Alternating yellow and white markings mean short-term parking or a bus stop. A white rectangle painted on the road indicates a parking zone. Multiple diagonal white lines mean parking for motorbikes only.

Sign vocabulary 
Most road signs in Thailand use Thai (ภาษาไทย); the official and national language of that country. However, English is used for important directional signs such as CIQ checkpoints, airports, and tourist attractions. Below are translations of road signs:

ระวัง = Caution
ลดความเร็ว = Reduce speed
ขับช้าๆ = Go slow
เขตอุบัติเหตุ = Accident area
พื้นที่อุบัติเหตุ = Accident prone area
เขตชุมชน = Village area
เขตโรงเรียน = School area
ก่อสร้างข้างหน้า = Construction ahead
สุดเขตก่อสร้าง = End of construction
เขตพระราชฐาน = Royal court area
ที่ดินกองทัพอากาศ = Armed forces base area
พื้นที่หวงห้าม = Prohibited area
พื้นที่น้ำท่วม = Flood area
หยุด = Stop
ให้ทาง = Give way (yield)
จำกัดความเร็ว = Speed limits
จำกัดความสูง = Height limit
กรุณาเปิดไฟหน้า = Turn on headlights
ฉุกเฉิน = Emergency
ยกเว้นกรณีฉุกเฉิน = Except emergency
เหนือ = North
ใต้ = South
ตะวันตก = West
ตะวันออก = East
แยก = Interchange
แยกไป = Junction to
ทางออก = Exit
ทางออกไป = Exit to
ทางเข้าไป = Entry to (e.g. at weighing bridge)
ถนน = Road
ทางพิเศษ = Expressway, highway
ด่าน = Toll plaza
จุดพักรถ = Rest and service areas
สุขา = Toilet
โทรศัพท์ = Telephone
อุโมงค์ = Tunnel
สะพาน = Bridge
จุดชั่งน้ำหนัก = Weighing bridge
สถานีรถไฟ = Railway station
เติมน้ำมัน = Petrol station
วัด = Temple
ท่าอากาศยาน = Airport
ท่าอากาศยานนานาชาติ = International airport
มัสยิด = Mosque
อาคาร = Building
ชุมสายโทรศัพท์ = Telephone exchange building
น้ำตก = Waterfall
หาด = Beach
แหลม = Cape
อ่าว = Bay
เกาะ = Island
แม่น้ำ = River
คลอง = Canal

See also 
Integrated Transport Information System
Thai highway network
Transportation in Thailand
Road signs in Asia
Comparison of Asian road signs
Road signs in ASEAN

References 

Thailand
Road transport in Thailand